The Elks Club Lodge No. 501 is a historic Elks Lodge located at Joplin, Jasper County, Missouri. It was built in 1904–1905, and is a two-story brick and stone hip roofed building designed in Colonial Revival / Georgian Revival architectural styles.  It measures 102 feet by 62 feet and features a columned portico flanked by two slightly projecting bays accentuated by limestone quoins.

It was listed on the National Register of Historic Places in 1985.

References

Elks buildings
Clubhouses on the National Register of Historic Places in Missouri
Colonial Revival architecture in Missouri
Georgian Revival architecture in Missouri
Buildings and structures completed in 1905
Buildings and structures in Joplin, Missouri
National Register of Historic Places in Jasper County, Missouri
1905 establishments in Missouri